Dov Shafrir was Israel's first Custodian of Absentees' Property, tasked with cataloguing and redistributing to Jewish residents or immigrants the property of the 700,000 or so Palestinians who had fled or been expelled from their homes in 1948, before and after the state of Israel declared its independence on 14 May that year.

See also
 Present absentee
 Depopulated Palestinian locations in Israel

References

Israeli civil servants
Possibly living people